A warehouse line of credit is a credit line used by mortgage bankers. It is a short-term revolving credit facility extended by a financial institution to a mortgage loan originator for the funding of mortgage loans.

The cycle starts with the mortgage banker taking a loan application from the property buyer. Then the loan originator secures an investor (often a large institutional bank) to whom the loan will be sold, whether directly or through a securitization. This decision is generally based on an institutional investor's published rates for various types of mortgage loans, while the selection of a warehouse lender for a particular loan may vary based on the types of loan products allowed by the warehouse provider or investors in the loan approved by the warehouse lender to be on the line of credit.

After an investor has been selected, the mortgage banker draws on the warehouse line of credit to fund a mortgage and sends the loan documentation to the warehouse credit-providing institution to act as a collateral for the line of credit. The warehouse lender, at this stage, perfects a security interest in the mortgage note to serve as collateral. When the loan is finally sold to a permanent investor, the line of credit is paid off by wired funds from this permanent investor to the warehouse facility and the cycle starts all over again for the next loan.

Typical durations that loans are held on the warehouse line, called dwell time, range based on the speed at which investors review mortgage loans for purchase after their submission by mortgage banks. In practice, this length of time is generally between 10-20 days. Warehouse facilities typically limit the amount of dwell time a loan can be on the warehouse line. For loans going over dwell, mortgage bankers are often forced to buy these notes off the line with their own cash in anticipation of a potential problem with the note.

The International Finance Corporation has set up warehouse lines of credit around the world and has developed a guide on how they work.

Warehouse lines of credit play an important role in making the mortgage loan market more accessible to property buyers since many mortgage bankers would not be able to attract sufficient amount of deposits that are necessary to fund mortgage loans by themselves. Therefore, warehouse funding allows the loan originators to provide mortgages at more competitive rates. Unlike in other types of lending, loan originators earn more profit from origination fees rather than interest rate spread since the closed mortgage loan is sold quickly to an investor.

The warehouse funding providing institution accepts various types of mortgage collateral, including  subprime and equity loans, residential or commercial, including specialty property types. The warehouse lenders in most cases provide the loan for a period of fifteen to sixty days. Warehouse lines of credit are usually priced off 1-month LIBOR plus a spread. Also, warehouse lenders typically apply a 'haircut' to credit line advances meaning that only 98% - 99% of the face amount of loans are being funded by them; the originating lenders have to provide with the remainder from their own capital.

Purpose
Reasons for using a warehouse line of credit include:
 Permanent Funding: Mortgage lender does not have to draw deposits - the line of credit provides permanent funding for the life of all loans in the program.
 Less Risk: No margin calls - once the asset is funded, there is generally no additional mark-to-market and/or posting of additional collateral. In the event a loan exceeds dwell limit as described above, additional collateral may be required. 
 Leverage: A Warehouse line of credit provides the mortgage banker with leverage. This leverage can be as high as 15:1. Leverage increases return by allowing a mortgage banker with relatively limited capital (compared to a traditional depository) to originate and sell far more mortgages than its capital would otherwise allow. This feature enables specialty lenders to maximize loan production revenue while minimizing their need to manage multiple sources of equity or other debt. 

In addition, the warehouse credit provider can manage exposure to the mortgage loan market without building a branch network of its own.

Other information
Warehouse lending can be differentiated between 'wet funding' and 'dry funding'. The difference is related to when the loan originator gets his funds with respect to the time at which the real estate transaction takes place. During 'wet funding' the mortgage loan provider gets the funds at the same time as the loan is closed, i.e. before the loan documentation is sent to the warehouse credit provider. 'Dry funding' takes place when the warehouse credit provider gets the loan documentation for review before sending the funds.

An important risk management function of warehouse lending is fraud detection and deterrence. The primary fraud risks include collusion between mortgage bankers, title companies, real estate agents, and customers themselves, as well as falsified information in the loan application (especially appraisals), forged signatures on  loan documents, and false documents of title that together create unsaleable and/or fraudulent loans pledged as warehouse collateral. 'Wet funded" loans are riskier in terms of possible fraud because the credit provider will not be aware of potential collateral problems until after the funds are sent to the loan closing agent.  Measures that the warehouse lender can take to limit fraud can be a strong screening process for mortgage banking companies, making sure the loan originator itself has a strong internal screening process, limiting the amount available for 'wet funding,' and requiring that all payment proceeds come through the warehouse lender first from the end purchaser of the mortgage loan held for resale.

See also
Warehouse bank

References

Mortgage